Obodas I (Nabataean Aramaic:  ʿŌbōdaṯ) was king of the Nabataeans from 96 BC to 85 BC. After his death, Obodas was worshiped as a deity.

Life
Obodas was the successor of Aretas II, from whom he inherited the war with the Hasmonean kingdom. He defeated them around 93 BCE on the Golan Heights.

Then he ambushed Alexander Jannaeus near Gadara (Umm Qais), just east of the Sea of Galilee. Using camel cavalry, he forced Jannaeus into a  valley where he completed the ambush, thereby getting revenge for the Nabateans' loss of Gaza. Moab and Gilead, two mountains east of the Dead Sea and the Jordan River, were returned.

Around 86 BCE, the Seleucid ruler, Antiochus XII Dionysus, invaded Nabatea. During the Battle of Cana, Antiochus was slain and his demoralized army perished in the desert. The Nabataeans, seeing how Obodas defeated both the Hasmoneans and the Greeks, started to venerate Obodas as a god.

Obodas was buried in the Negev, at a place that was renamed in his honour, Avdat. He was succeeded by his brother Aretas III.

See also
 List of Nabataean kings

References
''This article draws heavily on the :nl:Obodas I article in the Dutch-language Wikipedia, which was accessed in the version of September 15, 2008.

1st-century BC Nabataean monarchs
2nd-century BC Arabs
1st-century BC Arabs
2nd-century BC births
80s BC deaths
1st-century BC rulers in Asia
Deified people
Gilead